The 2013 season was FK Haugesund's 4th season back in the Tippeligaen since their promotion in 2009 and their fifth season with Jostein Grindhaug as manager. They participated in the Tippeligaen finishing third, qualifying for the first qualifying round of the 2014–15 UEFA Europa League. They also reached the Semi-finals of the Cup, where they lost to Rosenborg.

Squad

Out on loan

Transfers

Winter

In:

Out:

Summer

In:

Out:

Competitions

Tippeligaen

Results summary

Results by round

Results

Table

Norwegian Cup

Squad statistics

Appearances and goals

|-
|colspan="14"|Players away from Haugesund on loan:

|-
|colspan="14"|Players who left Haugesund during the season:

|}

Goal scorers

Disciplinary record

Notes

References

FK Haugesund seasons
Haugesund